

Malaysia

Current
Radio Televisyen Malaysia (RTM)
TV1
TV2
TV Okey
Berita RTM
Sukan RTM
TV6
Media Prima
TV3
DidikTV KPM
TV9
Alhijrah Media Corporation
TV Alhijrah
Bernama
Bernama TV 
Awesome Media Network
Awesome TV
Sarawak Media Group
TVS
DNF Group 
SUKE TV
Astro (By channel listing)
Astro Ria (104)
Astro Prima (105)
Astro Oasis (106)
TV Alhijrah (114)
Astro Citra (108) (selected programmes only)
Astro Warna (107)
Sony One HD (393)
K-Plus HD (396)
HBO HD (411)
Astro Awani (501)
Love Nature (550)
Global Trekker (551) (selected programmes only)
History HD (555) (selected programmes only)
Astro Ceria (611) (dual sound) 
Nickelodeon & Nick Jr (616, 617) (bilingual - English, Malay)
Cartoon Network (615) (bilingual - English, Malay) 
Asian Food Network (709) (selected programmes only)
Astro Arena (801)
Unifi TV (By channel listing)
Inspirasi (118)
Salam (113)
Sensasi (116)
DEGUP (120)
SIAR (121)
RTM Parlimen (633)

Former or defunct
MetroVision (1995-1999), shut down and revived as 8TV
Channel 9 (2003–2005), shut down and revived as TV9
TV5 (1.4.2017-8.4.2017), suddenly ceased broadcasting a week after the launch
8TV, no longer broadcasts any Malay-language programmes
TV Pendidikan, ceased broadcasting in 2008. Replaced by EDUWEBTV.
Astro Kirana, ceased broadcasting on 18 May 2009, replaced with Astro Citra on 1 June 2009
Astro Aruna, ceased transmissions in Malaysia and Singapore and Brunei due to declining viewership of the channel.
Disney Channel, ceased broadcasting and transmission on 1 January 2021 due to arrival of Disney+ Hotstar in Malaysia six months later and replaced by Boomerang on 15 December 2020.
Disney Junior, ceased broadcasting and transmission on 1 January 2021 due to arrival of Disney+ Hotstar in Malaysia six months later and replaced by Nick Jr. on 15 December 2020.
Disney XD, ceased broadcasting and transmission in Southeast Asia on 1 January 2021 due to a review of Disney's business in the region, but content moving to Disney+ Hotstar which eventually was launched in Malaysia on 1 June 2021.
Astro Box Office Movies Tayangan Hebat ceased broadcasting and transmission on 1 June 2021 due to the low popularity, but Astro OD (On Demand) service continue reserves.
Fox Sports 3 ceased broadcasting and transmission on 1 October 2021, with several of its content were moved to Astro SuperSport 5 that was launched on the same time.
National Geographic and Nat Geo Wild will cease to broadcast on 1 February 2023. Both channels were replaced by Global Trekker and Love Nature on the same day.

See also
 List of television stations in Malaysia
 List of television stations in Singapore

Television channels in Brunei
Television in Malaysia
Television in Singapore
Singaporean television-related lists
Malaysian television-related lists
Lists of television channels by language